The 2013-14 Turkish Men's Volleyball League was the 44th edition of the top-flight professional men's volleyball league in Turkey.

Regular season

League table

Source: Turkish Volleyball Federation

Play-out

Playoffs

References

External links 
Turkish Volleyball Federastion official web page

Men's
2013 in Turkish sport
2014 in Turkish sport